Leptacline (INN; developmental code name SD 210-32) is a drug described as a respiratory stimulant that was never marketed. It has a similar chemical structure to various piperidine and piperazine psychostimulants.

See also
 2-Benzylpiperidine
 4-Benzylpiperidine
 Benzylpiperazine

References

1-Piperidinyl compounds
Respiratory agents